The 1979 UCI Road World Championships took place on 26 August 1979 in Valkenburg, the Netherlands.

Results

Medal table

External links 

 Men's results
 Women's results
  Results at sportpro.it

 
UCI Road World Championships by year
UCI Road World Championships 1979
1979 in road cycling
Uci Road World Championships, 1979
Cycling in Valkenburg aan de Geul